The Inn at Lincoln Park is a hotel at 601 W. Diversey in Chicago's Lincoln Park neighborhood.

History
Originally called the Bentmere Hotel, the building was built in 1916 at a cost of $150,000. It was designed by Robert C. Berlin and was originally owned by Leon A. Bentley. Vincent Drucci resided at the Bentmere for a time. By the 1990s, the building was a Comfort Inn, and by 2004, it was the Inn at Lincoln Park. Plans to demolish the building and construct a new larger hotel were put forward in 2004 and 2014, and faced significant community opposition.

References

1916 establishments in Illinois
Hotels in Chicago
Hotel buildings completed in 1916